Firas Katoussi (born 6 September 1995) is a Tunisian taekwondo practitioner. He won one of the bronze medals in the men's lightweight event at the 2022 World Taekwondo Championships held in Guadalajara, Mexico. He represented Tunisia at the 2019 African Games held in Rabat, Morocco and he won the gold medal in the men's 74 kg event. He also won the gold medal in the men's 74 kg event at the 2019 Military World Games held in Wuhan, China.

In 2020, he competed in the men's 80 kg event at the African Olympic Qualification Tournament in Rabat, Morocco without qualifying for the 2020 Summer Olympics in Tokyo, Japan. He finished in 3rd place.

He won one of the bronze medals in the men's 80 kg event at the 2022 Mediterranean Games held in Oran, Algeria.

References

External links 
 

Living people
1995 births
Place of birth missing (living people)
Tunisian male taekwondo practitioners
African Games gold medalists for Tunisia
African Games medalists in taekwondo
Competitors at the 2019 African Games
African Taekwondo Championships medalists
World Taekwondo Championships medalists
Mediterranean Games bronze medalists for Tunisia
Mediterranean Games medalists in taekwondo
Competitors at the 2022 Mediterranean Games
21st-century Tunisian people